William Lockhart of Tarbrax was the son of George Lockhart of Tarbrax and Anne Lockhart of Tarbrax.  His sister Anne, became Countess of Aberdeen.  Camilla, Duchess of Cornwall, a current member of the British Royal Family, is a descendant of his sister.

His will (dated 1672) said he desired his funeral to be "performed privately at Lanark in the Lea Ile by some few of my friends" (NAS GD 33/62/2).

Baptised 26 December 1650.

Died 1672.

1650 births
1672 deaths
People from South Lanarkshire